Edward Morgan Humphreys OBE, (1882–1955) was a Welsh novelist, translator, and journalist, often known as E. Morgan Humphreys. He also sometimes wrote under the pseudonym Celt

Humphreys edited Y Genedl Gymreig and translated The Gorse Glen by Hugh Evans into English. He also wrote about socialism.

He was made an Officer of the Order of the British Empire in 1953.

References 

Welsh-language writers
Welsh journalists
People from Merionethshire
1882 births
1955 deaths
Officers of the Order of the British Empire